Mohamed Ould Bilal (born in 1963, Rosso), is a Mauritanian politician serving as the prime minister of Mauritania since 6 August 2020.

Career

Prime minister 
Prior to become the new Prime Minister Mohamed Ould Bilal worked as the head of the national water agency. 

After an investigation on the activities of the former head of state Mohamed Ould Abdel Aziz former Prime Minister Ismail Ould Bedda Ould Cheikh Sidiya and the entire administration resigned.

On 6 August 2020 Mohamed Ould Cheikh El Ghazouani appointed Mohamed Ould Bilal as new Prime Minister and asked him to form a new government.

See also
First government of Mohamed Ould Bilal
Second government of Mohamed Ould Bilal

References 

Living people
1963 births
Prime Ministers of Mauritania
People from Trarza Region
21st-century Mauritanian politicians